Cameraria saliciphaga is a moth of the family Gracillariidae. It is known from Tajikistan, Turkmenistan and Uzbekistan.

The larvae feed on Salix species (including Salix australior, Salix excelsa and Salix triandra). They mine the leaves of their host plant.

References

Cameraria (moth)

Moths of Asia
Moths described in 1975
Taxa named by Vladimir Ivanovitsch Kuznetzov